Flora and Son is a 2023 American-Irish musical comedy-drama film written and directed by John Carney, featuring original songs by Carney and Gary Clark, and starring Joseph Gordon-Levitt, Eve Hewson, Jack Reynor and Orén Kinlan. The film premiered at the 2023 Sundance Film Festival on January 22, 2023.

Synopsis
A single mother (Hewson) in Dublin is having trouble with her petty thief teenage son Max and is encouraged by the Garda to find Max a hobby. She rescues an old guitar from a skip and with the help of a Los Angeles-based online guitar teacher (Gordon-Levitt) discovers that one person's rubbish can be another person's salvation.

Cast
 Eve Hewson as Flora 
 Joseph Gordon-Levitt as Jeff
 Orén Kinlan as Max
 Jack Reynor as Ian
 Sophie Vavasseur as Juanita
 Kelly Thornton as Heart

Production

Filming
Principal photography took place on location in Dublin. Hewson and Gordon-Levitt were photographed with guitars whilst filming in Griffith Park in the summer of 2022.

Music
Original songs for the film come from Carney and Gary Clark, with Clark also writing the score. Clark and Carney had previously collaborated on music for film, stage and television. Speaking at the 2023 Sundance Film Festival Gordon-Levitt was quoted as saying "I finally got to play music in a movie! It’s really true, I’ve always wanted to do it and I’ve always been a musician at heart and love doing it. I’ve learned to do many things for movies. I’ve learned to walk on a tightrope or play hockey or, certainly, lots of fighting and shooting and things like that. But this time I was practicing a skill that I’ve practiced most of my life, but having to do it at a bit more of a skill level than what I was used to." Hewson could play the guitar before they made the film and said all singing she does on screen is her and told The Hollywood Reporter although she had to overcome a "massive, massive fear" of singing in the movie, she never turned to her dad (musician Bono) for musical tips: "I’d rather sing in front of the entire world."

Release
The film premiered at the 2023 Sundance Film Festival on January 22, 2023. The songs reportedly produced a "spontaneous clap-a-long and rapturous standing ovation" during its first screening.  Two days after premiering, Apple TV+ bought the distribution rights for "just under" $20 million.

References

External links
 

2023 films
2023 comedy-drama films
2023 independent films
2020s American films
2020s English-language films
2020s musical comedy-drama films
American independent films
American musical comedy-drama films
Apple TV+ original films
English-language Irish films
FilmNation Entertainment films
Films about guitars and guitarists
Films about mother–son relationships
Films directed by John Carney
Films set in Dublin (city)
Films shot in Dublin (city)
Irish independent films
Irish musical comedy-drama films